The 2012 German Indoor Athletics Championships was the 59th edition of the national championship in indoor track and field for Germany. It was held on 25–26 February at the Europahalle Karlsruhe in Karlsruhe. A total of 28 events, 14 for men and 14 for women, were contested plus three further events were held separately. It was to serve as preparation for the 2012 IAAF World Indoor Championships.

The combined events national championships were held on 28–29 January at the Helmut-Körnig-Halle in Dortmund. The 3 × 1000 m relays were held on 19 February alongside the  German Indoor Youth Athletics Championships in Sindelfingen. 

For the first time, the 4 × 400 metres relay was no longer in the program. The men's 4 × 200 metres relay relay team from TV Wattenscheid 01 Athletics ran a German record. Championship records were set by Björn Otto in the pole vault and Carolin Walter over 800 metres. European-leading performances were set by Cathleen Tschirch in the 200 metres and David Storl in the shot put.

Results

Men

Women

References

Results
2013 German Indoor Championships. German Athletics Federation. Retrieved 2021-04-06.
Overall Results. German Athletics Federation. Retrieved 2021-04-06.
Racewalking Results. German Athletics Federation. Retrieved 2021-04-06.

External links
German Athletics Federation website

German Indoor Athletics Championships
German Indoor Athletics Championships
German Indoor Athletics Championships
German Indoor Athletics Championships
Sport in Karlsruhe